is a Japanese professional wrestler who stood out in All Japan Women's Pro-Wrestling.

Career 
Nagahori was born in Saitama, Japan, and began her career as a fighter in 1984 in the All Japan Women's Pro-Wrestling. She received trophies and medals and received the title of champion. Fighting with Yumi Ogura in a team called the Red Typhoons, she defeated the Americans Velvet McIntyre and Judy Martin. Nagahori alone defeated Bull Nakano, Devil Masami, Itsuki Yamazaki and Mika Komatsu.

Nagahori fought approximately 21 fights and retired in 1988.

Moves 
Bearings sobatto
Kicking leg stretch
Foot sword

Championships and accomplishments
All Japan Women's Pro-Wrestling
All Japan Tag Team Championship (1 time)
WWWA World Tag Team Championship (1 time)
Network Championship Red Typhoons (Yumi Ogura and Kazue Nagahori)

External links
Wrestlingdata Profile

1968 births
Living people
Sportspeople from Saitama Prefecture
Japanese female professional wrestlers